Angeliki Lagoumtzi (born 23 November 1982) is a Greek former footballer who played as a midfielder.

Lagoumtzi was part of the Greece women's national football team at the 2004 Summer Olympics. On club level she played for Kavala 86.

See also
 Greece at the 2004 Summer Olympics

References

External links
 
 
 
 

1982 births
Living people
Place of birth missing (living people)
Greek women's footballers
Women's association football midfielders
Greece women's international footballers
Olympic footballers of Greece
Footballers at the 2004 Summer Olympics
21st-century Greek women